Damias peculiaris is a moth of the family Erebidae. It is found in New Ireland.

References

Damias
Moths described in 1936